Helmut Cämmerer (born 5 May 1911, date of death unknown) is a German sprint canoeist, born in Hamburg, who competed in the 1930s. He won the silver medal in the K-1 1000 m event at the 1936 Summer Olympics in Berlin.

Cämmerer also won a silver medal in the K-1 1000 m event at the 1938 ICF Canoe Sprint World Championships in Vaxholm.

References
DatabaseOlympics.com profile

Mention of Helmut Cämmerer's death (Inactive as of November 16, 2008)

1911 births
Sportspeople from Hamburg
Canoeists at the 1936 Summer Olympics
German male canoeists
Olympic canoeists of Germany
Olympic silver medalists for Germany
Year of death missing
Olympic medalists in canoeing
ICF Canoe Sprint World Championships medalists in kayak
Medalists at the 1936 Summer Olympics